Chemillé-en-Anjou (literally Chemillé in Anjou) is a commune in the Maine-et-Loire department of western France. Chemillé is the municipal seat.

History 
It was established on 15 December 2015 by the merger of the former communes of Chanzeaux, La Chapelle-Rousselin, Chemillé-Melay, Cossé-d'Anjou, La Jumellière, Neuvy-en-Mauges, Sainte-Christine, Saint-Georges-des-Gardes, Saint-Lézin, La Salle-de-Vihiers, La Tourlandry and Valanjou. Chemillé-Melay had been formed in January 2013 by the merger of the former communes of Chemillé and Melay.

Population

See also 
Communes of the Maine-et-Loire department

References

External links 
Official website

Chemilleenanjou
States and territories established in 2015
Anjou